Elisa Penna (born 13 November 1995) is an Italian basketball player for the Reyer Venezia Mestre women's team and the Italian national team. She played for Wake Forest University and her Demon Deacon career was ended prematurely in early 2019 by a knee injury.

She participated at the EuroBasket Women 2017.

Wake Forest statistics

Source

References

Italian women's basketball players
Sportspeople from Bergamo
Power forwards (basketball)
Reyer Venezia players
Italian expatriate basketball people in the United States
Wake Forest Demon Deacons women's basketball players
1995 births
Living people